Liar Wanted is a 1961 Greek comedy film made by Finos Films, based on the same named theatrical work of Dimitris Psathas. It was directed by Giannis Dalianidis and starring Dinos Iliopoulos, Pantelis Zervos, Thanassis Vengos and Periklis Christoforidis.

Plot
Theodoros Parlas, known as the Pseftothodoros (the Lying-Theodoros) is a vocational liar. He comes from his village to Athens in search for work.  A lucky fight on a bus opens a road to his shining career.

Cast
Dinos Iliopoulos ..... Theodoros Parlas
Pantelis Zervos ..... Theofilos Ferekis
Anna Kyriakou ..... Jenny Fereki
Martha Karagianni ..... Pitsa Kitsa
Thanasis Veggos ..... Vrasidas
Periklis Christoforidis ..... Agisilaos
Panagiotis Karavousianos ..... Patatias
Margarita Athanasiou ..... Pipitsa
Popi Lazou ..... Zozo
Dimitris Nikolaidis ..... Panagis Dervisis
Angelos Mavropoulos ..... Maratos

See also
List of Greek films

External links

Ziteitai pseftis at cine.gr

1960 films
1960 comedy films
Greek films based on plays
Films set in Athens
Films set in Greece
Finos Film films
Greek comedy films
1960s Greek-language films
1961 comedy films
1961 films
Films directed by Giannis Dalianidis